SJK Akatemia (formerly Kerho 07 in 2013–2015) is a football club from Seinäjoki in Finland. The club was formed in 2012 and their home ground is at the OmaSP Stadion. SJK Akatemia is SJK's 'B team' and currently plays in the Ykkönen, or the second level of football in Finland.  SJK Akatemia also contains SJK U20 and SJK U17. In 2018 SJK started a football high school with Kuortane sports school. It produces young players to SJK and SJK Akatemia.

Current squad

Staff
 
Head Coaches: Brian Page and Arttu Aromaa
Fitness Coaches: Tommi Pärmäkoski, Pekka Koskela, Jaakko Ojaniemi and Mika Hormalainen
Goalkeeping Coaches: Luis Fernando and Jari Kujala
Team Manager, Secretary: Jorma Tuohisaari
Talent Coach: Mika Ojala

References

External links

Football clubs in Finland
Seinäjoki
2012 establishments in Finland